NH 155 may refer to:

 National Highway 155 (India)
 New Hampshire Route 155, United States